Parramatta Eels Women are a rugby league team, representing the Parramatta region of Sydney, New South Wales. The team is part of the Parramatta Eels club and plays in the National Rugby League Women's Premiership. The club announced their first player signings in late June 2021.

Seasons 
The Parramatta Eels Women's team entered the National Rugby League Women's Premiership in the postponed 2021 season on 27 February 2022.

Head-to-head records

Notes
 Share % is the percentage of points For over the sum of points For and Against.
 Clubs listed in the order than the Eels Women first played them.

Current squad 
The team is coached by Dean Widders. 
Jersey numbers in the table reflect those assigned for the Grand Final. 
Table last updated on 22 Oct 2022.

Club Records

Player Records 
Lists and tables last updated: 22 October 2022.

Most Games for the Eels
 Kennedy Cherrington  12, Ellie Johnston  12, Simaima Taufa  12, Filomina Hanisi  12, 'Seli Mailangi  12, Rikeya Horne  11, Christian Pio  11, Tiana Penitani  10.

Most Tries for the Eels
 Simaima Taufa  5, Tiana Penitani  4.

Most Points for the Eels (16+)

Most Points in a Season (16+)

Margins and Streaks 
Biggest winning margins
 

Biggest losing margins

Most consecutive wins
 2  (18 September 2022  25 September 2022)

Most consecutive losses
 6  (20 March 2022  10 September 2022)

Players 
The following players have appeared in NRL Women's Premiership matches for the Eels.
Table last updated: 23 October 2022.

References

External Links 
 Official Website
 Parramatta Eels Women at Rugby League Project

 
NRL Women's Premiership clubs
Rugby league teams in Sydney
Women's rugby league teams in Australia